Elti Fits were a punk rock band in Manchester, England in the late seventies and early eighties.

Description
The members were:
Bass - Nigel Ross
Drums - Karl Burns
Guitar - Graham Ellis
Vocals - Sarah Keynes

Their manager was Paula Greatbatch aka Ruth Putrid.

Activities
The band did a session for John Peel on 4 September 1979 followed by a roadshow in 1980.

On 10 October 1980 they topped a bill of five bands at the Manchester Polytechnic Student Union bar that included U2. They played Leigh Festival in 1979 and one of their songs is included on the 2-CD set Live at Leigh Rock Festival. They also performed 8 tracks at Deeply Vale Festivals and a good recording of that set may exist.

They worked with Joy Division.
One of their songs is available on YouTube. .

Their only record was a three track EP.

References

English punk rock groups